Basic Cave Diving: A Blueprint for Survival, also commonly referred to by the subtitle alone, A Blueprint for Survival, is a short book on safe scuba diving procedures for cave diving by pioneer cave diver Sheck Exley, originally published in 1979, by the Cave Diving Section of the National Speleological Society. It is considered to have had a significant impact on the number of cave diving fatalities since publication, and is considered one of the more historically important publications in recreational diving.

Content
The book is in ten chapters, each based on the analysis of an accident report. The pdf version of the 5th edition has 46 pages.
The foreword explains how Exley was inspired to write the book after viewing some state highway patrol accident report pictures, and realizing how effectively they brought him to understand the possible consequences of unsafe driving, and how he applied this approach to the structure of the book.
Chapter 1: 
Chapter 2: 
Chapter 3: 
Chapter 4: 
Chapter 5: 
Chapter 6: 
Chapter 7: 
Chapter 8: 
Chapter 9: 
Chapter 10: 
There are four appendices:
A Blueprint for Survival – Ten Recommendations for Safe Cave Diving
Certified Training Course Requirements: NSS Cave Diving Section
NSS Cavern and Cave Diving Instructors
In Case of Accident...

Impact
One of the first manuals on cave diving safety, and written at a time when cave diving fatalities were relatively frequent, it is still considered relevant in the 21st century, as the basic principles have not changed much.

Editions
First published 1979, then again in 1980, 1991 and 1984. The fifth edition was published in 1986. It is available for free upload from the NSSCDS.

References

1979 non-fiction books
Cave diving
Underwater diving safety
Underwater diving books